

Events

Caribbean Sea
January –  bombards and destroys several pirate vessels careening on St. Croix, stranding the pirate crew.
Late February – Black Sam Bellamy in the Sultana takes the Whydah Gally near Jamaica and keeps it for his own use.
April 1 – Benjamin Hornigold and a pirate named Napping capture a large armed sloop, the Bennet, out of Jamaica.
April 4 – At Bluefield's Bay in Jamaica, Hornigold and Napping capture the sloop Revenge carrying a load of Spanish gold.
September 29 – "Gentleman Pirate" Stede Bonnet, who has traded plantation life for a pirate ship, transfers command of his sloop, the Revenge, to Blackbeard. 
November 28 – Blackbeard captures the French slave ship La Concorde near Martinique, equips her with 40 guns, and renames her the Queen Anne's Revenge.
December 10 – Blackbeard overtakes and ransacks the merchant sloop Margaret off the coast of Anguilla near Crab Island.

North America
Spring – Edward Teach and Benjamin Hornigold take two sloops to Virginia, robbing three vessels en route, then return to Nassau, Bahamas.
April – Bellamy seizes a merchant vessel off South Carolina.
April 26 – The Whydah Gally wrecks in a nor'easter off Cape Cod, Massachusetts; Bellamy and 143 men are drowned. Over 4 tons of treasure is lost under just  of water – it would elude discovery for over 260 years.
July – Stede Bonnet's pirates in the Revenge plunder the Anne, Turbet, Endeavour, and Young off the coast of Virginia, burning the Turbet.
August – Bonnet raids two vessels off South Carolina, firing one.
October – Edward Teach and Stede Bonnet raid shipping in the mouth of Delaware Bay.
October 12 – Blackbeard captures a Captain Codd and his vessel off the Delaware capes. He later captures and loots the Spofford and Sea Nymph.
October 22 – Blackbeard, on the Revenge, stops and plunders the Robert and Good Intent of their cargo.

Europe
September 5 – King George I of Great Britain issues a royal decree, known as the Act of Grace, pardoning all pirates who surrender to the appointed authorities by 5 September 1718.

Deaths
 April 27 – Black Sam Bellamy, pirate commander captain (born February 23, 1689, aged 28), along with 143 of his crew.

See also 
1716 in piracy
1717 for other events
1718 in piracy
Timeline of piracy

References 

Piracy
Piracy by year
1717 in military history